The Glacier Range Riders are an independent baseball team of the Pioneer League, an MLB Partner League, who are scheduled to begin play in 2022. They will be located in Kalispell, Montana and play their home games at Flathead Field. 

The Range Riders are named for nearby Glacier National Park, established in 1910. The team chose to reveal their name on January 19 at 10:00 am to commemorate its founding.

History
With the contraction of Minor League Baseball in 2021, the Pioneer League was converted from an MLB-affiliated Rookie Advanced league to an independent baseball league and granted status as an MLB Partner League.

With the transition, the Pioneer League added the Boise Hawks, a former member of the Northwest League, for the 2021 season. To keep the league at eight teams, the Northern Colorado Owlz (formerly the Orem Owlz) sat out 2021. With the return of the Owlz for 2022, a tenth team was needed to balance the schedule, and on August 16, 2021, Ridge Run Baseball LLC was awarded an expansion team to begin play in 2022.

The announcement also revealed that a new ballpark would be constructed alongside U.S. Route 93 north of Kalispell. The park, currently known as Flathead Field, will seat 2,500 and feature artificial turf.

The franchise is debuted on May 23, 2022 against the Rocky Mountain Vibes with their first home game occurring on June 14 against the Billings Mustangs.

References

External links
 

Pioneer League (baseball) teams
Professional baseball teams in Montana
2021 establishments in Montana
Baseball teams established in 2021
Kalispell, Montana